Srđan Vulović (born 1965) is a Kosovo Serb politician. Since 2019, has been the president (i.e., mayor) of Zubin Potok, a predominantly Serbian municipality in northern Kosovo on the border with Central Serbia. He also served in the National Assembly of Serbia from 1997 to 2001.

Private career
Vulović is a graduated transportion engineer. He has overseen the Belgrade-based company Ibar, which manages energy production on Gazivoda Lake, an artificial lake that produces vital cooling water for two coal plants that provided ninety-five per cent of Kosovo's electricity in 2018. Ownership of the lake and its resources have been the subject of a dispute between the governments of Serbia and Kosovo; Vulović contends that the right to manage the lake belongs to Serbia.

Politician

Parliamentarian
Vulović received the fourth position on the electoral list of the Socialist Party of Serbia (Socijalistička partija Srbije, SPS) for the division of Kosovska Mitrovica in the 1997 Serbian parliamentary election. The list won five out of seven seats in the division, and Vulović was included in the SPS's parliamentary delegation when the national assembly convened in December 1997. (From 1992 to 2000, Serbia's electoral law stipulated that one-third of parliamentary mandates would be assigned to candidates from successful lists in numerical order, while the remaining two-thirds would be distributed amongst other candidates on the lists by the sponsoring parties. It was common practice for the latter mandates to be awarded out of numerical order; Vulović's list position did not give him an automatic mandate.) The Socialist Party won the election, and Vulović served as a supporter of the administration.

Serbia's electoral laws were reformed after the fall of Slobodan Milošević's government in October 2000, such that the entire country was counted as a single electoral division and all mandates were awarded to candidates on successful lists at the discretion of the sponsoring parties or coalitions, irrespective of numerical order. Vulović appeared in the twenty-eighth position on the Socialist Party's list in the 2000 Serbian parliamentary election, which was held in December of that year. The list won thirty-seven seats; on this occasion, he was not selected for a mandate. His term ended when the new assembly convened in January 2001.

Local politics

Early years
Vulović was identified in a December 2000 news report as chair of the municipal assembly of Zubin Potok, a position that was recognized in Serbia as equivalent to mayor. In this capacity, he helped to facilitate the distribution of voting materials among Kosovo Serb communities in the 2000 parliamentary election.

Like most Kosovo Serb politicians, Vulović strongly opposes Kosovo's 2008 declaration of independence and considers Kosovo to be the sovereign territory of Serbia. In 2008, he indicated that Kosovo Serb communities would not permit the authorities in Priština to re-establish checkpoints on the border with Central Serbia. He added that the communities would continue co-operating with the United Nations Interim Administration Mission in Kosovo (UNMIK) and Kosovo Force (KFOR), in accordance with United Nations Security Council Resolution 1244.

Mayor of Zubin Potok
The governments of Serbia and Kosovo partially normalized their relations under the 2013 Brussels Agreement, which, among other things, led to the renewed participation of northern Kosovo's Serb community in the broader politics of Kosovo. The agreement did not address the status of Kosovo, and the Serbian government considers Kosovo's current governing authorities to be provisional.

In November 2018, the mayors of Zubin Potok and three other predominantly Serb municipalities in the north of Kosovo resigned in protest against the Kosovo government's imposition of a one hundred per cent tax on goods from Serbia. Vulović ran as the candidate of the Serb List in the subsequent mayoral by-election for Zubin Potok; he described the vote as "a referendum on how much the state of Serbia will be present here" and called for a high voter turnout. The outcome was never in any serious doubt, and Vulović was elected mayor of the municipality in a landslide on 19 May 2019. 

Shortly after his election, Vulović criticized the Kosovo Police for making an incursion into Zubin Potok under the auspices of anti-smuggling campaign; he contended that the people arrested had no connections to the underground economy and that the police had causes significant property damage through their actions.

In April 2021, he signed a twinning agreement between Zubin Potok and Gradiška in the Republika Srpska, Bosnia and Herzegovina.

He was re-elected, again without any serious competition, in the 2021 Kosovan local elections.

Electoral record

Local

Notes

References

1965 births
Living people
Kosovo Serbs
People from Zubin Potok
Mayors of places in Serbia
Mayors of places in Kosovo
Members of the National Assembly (Serbia)
Socialist Party of Serbia politicians
Serb List (Kosovo) politicians